Landskrona Town Hall (Swedish: Landskrona rådhus) is a town hall located in Landskrona. The town hall was completed in 1884 and was designed by the Danish architect Ove Pedersen.

In the same place as the current town hall was previously an older medieval town hall, which was demolished to make room for the new current building.

The historical building is primarily used by the Landskrona district court and for Landskrona municipal council meetings.

Landskrona Town Hall Square 

Just outside the town hall is the city's primary square, the Town Hall Square (Swedish: "Rådhustorget"), which is known for its significant market trade, among other things.

The square is layered with a paving of artistic character as the view from above indicates a distinct pattern.

Additional artistic elements are found in the statue Västanvind (West Wind in English) from 1929, designed by Anders Olsson.

References 

City and town halls in Sweden
Buildings and structures in Landskrona
National Romantic architecture in Sweden
1884 establishments in Sweden
Government buildings completed in 1884
19th-century establishments in Skåne County
Office buildings in Sweden